Urt is a village and a commune in the Pyrénées-Atlantiques department in south-western France. It is part of the traditional province of Labourd.

Urt is the location of the Benedictine Belloc Abbey for monks and of St. Scholastica's Abbey for nuns. Urt station has rail connections to Tarbes, Pau and Bayonne.

Population

See also
Communes of the Pyrénées-Atlantiques department

References

External links

Commune d'Urt

Communes of Pyrénées-Atlantiques
Pyrénées-Atlantiques communes articles needing translation from French Wikipedia